Luis Eduardo Aponte Yuripe (born June 14, 1953) is a retired Venezuelan professional baseball player. He played as a right-handed middle relief pitcher in Major League Baseball for the Boston Red Sox and Cleveland Indians. In his career, Aponte compiled a 9–6 record with 113 strikeouts, seven saves, and a 3.27 ERA in 220 innings.

Aponte was signed by Boston as an amateur free agent in 1973.  He had his most effective season in 1982, earning three saves in 40 appearances with a 3.18 ERA. He pitched four innings in the longest professional baseball game.

See also

 List of players from Venezuela in Major League Baseball

External links
, or Retrosheet
Pelota Binaria (Venezuelan Winter League)

1953 births
Living people
Boston Red Sox players
Bristol Red Sox players
Cafeteros de Córdoba players
Cardenales de Lara players
Caribes de Oriente players
Cleveland Indians players
Cleveland Indians scouts
Diablos Rojos del México players
Elmira Pioneers players
Maine Guides players
Major League Baseball pitchers
Major League Baseball players from Venezuela
Mexican League baseball pitchers
Minor league baseball coaches
Pawtucket Red Sox players
People from El Tigre
Petroleros de Zulia players
Venezuelan baseball coaches
Venezuelan expatriate baseball players in Mexico
Venezuelan expatriate baseball players in the United States
Venezuelan Protestants
Winston-Salem Red Sox players
Winter Haven Red Sox players